This is the list of awards and nominations received by the television series Monk (2002–2009), starring Tony Shalhoub.

Major awards

Emmy Awards

Golden Globe Awards

Screen Actors Guild Awards

Other awards

ASCAP Awards

Family Television Awards

Gracie Allen Awards

Satellite Awards

Television Critics Association Awards

Young Artist Awards

References

Monk
Monk